Muhammad Asim Butt (Urdu: محمد عاصم بٹ) is an Urdu novelist, short story writer, translator, researcher, editor, critic and journalist. He has published three novels and two collections of short stories along with a number of books translated from English into Urdu and vice versa. Butt also writes in English.

Biography
Since 2006 he has worked with the Pakistan Academy of Letters, Government of Pakistan, as Editor of the quarterly Adabiyaat, a literary magazine.

Publications

Fiction
 Ishtihaar Aadami (Ad man اشتہار آدمی) (short stories), Fiction House, Lahore, Pakistan, 1998
 Daira (Circle دائرہ) (novel), Sanjh Publishers, Lahore, Pakistan, 2001 
 Dastak (Knock دستک) (short stories), Dunyazaad, Karachi, Pakistan, 2010

 Naatamaam (ناتمام) (An Unending Story) (novel), Sang e Meel Publications, Lahore, Pakistan,2014
 Bhaid (بھید) (secret) (novel), Sang e Meel Publications, Lahore, Pakistan,2018

Translations
English to Urdu
 Japani Kahanian ( selected short stories from Japanese Literature), Sareer Publications, Pakistan, 2019
 Borgese Kahanian بورخیس کہانیاں ( selected short stories by Gorge Luis Borgese), Sang e Meel Publications, Lahore, Pakistan, 2017
 So Azeem Aadami سو عظیم آدمی (The 100 by Michael H. Hart), Takhleeqat Publishers, Lahore, Pakistan, 1992
 Muhabbat Key Khatoot محبت کے خطوط (Love Letters by Khalil Gibran), Takhleeqat Publishers, Lahore, Pakistan, 1993
 Kafka Kahanian کافکا کہانیاں (translation of stories by Franz Kafka), Jang Publishers, Lahore, Pakistan, 1994.
 Mukhtasar Tareekh-e-Alam (A Short History of the World by H G Wells), Takhleeqat Publishers, Lahore, Pakistan, 1995.
 Marco Polo Ka Safarnama مارکو پولو کا سفر نامہ (Travelogue by Marco Polo), Takhleeqat Publishers, Lahore, Pakistan, 1999.
 Muhammad (Muhammad: A Biography of the Prophet by Karen Armstrong), Takhleeqat Publishers, Lahore, Pakistan, 2002.
 Toahamat ki Dunya توہمات کی دنیا (by Carl Sagan), Mashal, Lahore, Pakistan, 2003.
 Bai Moasam Key Phool (A selection of Japanese stories), Mashal, Lahore, Pakistan, 2003.
 Sarif Nama صارف نامہ (introduction to consumer rights), The Network for Consumer Protection, Islamabad, Pakistan, 2004.
 Fidelio فیڈیلیو (by Ludwig van Beethoven), Friedrich Naumann Stiftung Fur Die Freiheit, Islamabad, Pakistan, 2011.
 Taaleem Ka Liberal Nuqta-e-Nazar تعلیم کا لبرل نقطہ نظر (Liberal Readings on Education (by Stefan Melnik and Sascha Tamm [Eds.]), Friedrich Naumann Stiftung Fur Die Freiheit, Islamabad, Pakistan, 2012.
Urdu to English
 Tale of Four Saints (Retelling of Persian classic tale Qissah Chahaar Darvaish into English) National Book Foundation, Islamabad, 2016 and CreateSpace Independent Publishing Platform; Second edition (September 4, 2016).

Research and criticism
 Doosra Aadami (The Other Person دوسرا آدمی) (interviews), Jang Publishers, Lahore, Pakistan, 1993
 Pakistan Sal Ba Sal (Pakistan Year by Year پاکستان سال بہ سال, National Language Authority, Islamabad, Pakistan, 1999
 Insaani Haqooq aur Urdu Sahaafat انسانی حقوق اور اردو صحافت (Human Rights and Urdu Journalism), The Network for Consumer Protection, Islamabad,  Pakistan, 2005
 Abdullah Hussein: Shakhsiat Aur Fun عبداللہ حسین: شخصیت اور فن (Abdullah Hussein: Person & Work), Pakistan Academy of Letters, Islamabad, Pakistan, 2009.
 Kia Jamhooriat Pakistan Kay Liay Zaroori Hai? (Is Democracy Essential for Pakistan?), Liberal Forum Pakistan, Islamabad, Pakistan, 2010.
 Bahtareen Afsaanaon Ka Intikhab (a selection of best Urdu short stories in 2011), Takhleeqat Publishers, Lahore, Pakistan 2011

Recognition
Asim's novel Naatamaam ناتمام won Akse Khushbu (عکس خوشبو) Literary Award for Fiction for 2014.

Asim's novel Natamaam ناتمام has won UBL Literary Excellence Award for 2015. 

Asim's book "Borkhese Kahanian" (بورخیس کہانیاں) (urdu translation of short stories of Jorge Luis Borges) was short listed for the UBL Literary Excellence Award for 2019.

A selection of best short stories of Urdu Despairing Voices: Selected Urdu Short Stories compiled and translated by Syed Sarwar Hussein, published by Satyam Publishing House, India, 2011 includes two short stories of Butt.

A detailed research thesis based on the critical analysis of three modern Urdu novelists including Butt, by Robina Sultan, published with the title "Teen Nai Novel Nigar" by Dastaaveez Matbuaat, Lahore, Pakistan in 2012.

He participated as a speaker in the Oxford Literary Festival arranged by Oxford, Pakistan and British Council, Pakistan at Islamabad, Pakistan from 30 April to 1 May 2013.

References

Pakistani novelists
Urdu-language novelists
Pakistani male short story writers
Pakistani short story writers
Urdu-language short story writers
Urdu-language fiction writers
Pakistani translators
Government College University, Lahore alumni
Living people
People from Islamabad
Pakistani people of Kashmiri descent
Year of birth missing (living people)